Pierre-Étienne Lemaire (born 25 January 1991) is a French professional footballer who currently plays as a defender for Championnat National 2 side FC Villefranche. He previously played for Angers, making his debut for the club in the 2–2 draw with Sedan on 16 March 2012. He becomes a player of Ain Sud from 2022.

References
Pierre-Étienne Lemaire profile at foot-national.com

1991 births
Living people
Sportspeople from Tours, France
French footballers
Association football defenders
Angers SCO players
Vendée Poiré-sur-Vie Football players
CA Bastia players
Ligue 2 players
Championnat National players
Footballers from Centre-Val de Loire
Ain Sud players